The Shikshashtakam is a 16th-century Gaudiya Vaishnava Hindu prayer of eight verses composed in the Sanskrit language. They are the only verses left personally written by Chaitanya Mahaprabhu (1486 – 1534) with the majority of his philosophy being codified by his primary disciples, known as the Six Goswamis of Vrindavan. The Shikshashtakam is quoted within the Chaitanya Charitamrita, Krishnadasa Kaviraja Goswami's biography of Chaitanya Mahaprabhu, written in Bengali. The name of the prayer comes from the Sanskrit words , meaning 'instruction', and aṣṭaka, meaning 'consisting of eight parts', i.e., stanzas. The teachings contained within the eight verses are believed to contain the essence of all teachings on Bhakti yoga within the Gaudiya tradition.

Text

The first eight verses of the following are the complete text of the Shikshashtakam, as written in Sanskrit by Sri Chaitanya Mahaprabhu.  They are found in Krishnadasa Kaviraja's Sri Chaitanya Charitamrita (Antya-līlā, chapter 20, verses 12, 16, 21, 29, 32, 36, 39 and 47). The final verse is a Bengali quotation from Sri Chaitanya Charitamrita, Antya-līlā 20.65 - it is not part of the actual Shikshashtakam, but is often appended to the end when it is recited, describing the result of reciting the Shikshashtakam faithfully.

Verse 1

Translation
Literal:

Glory to the Shri Krishna sankirtana (congregational chanting of the Lord's holy names), which cleanses the heart of all the dust accumulated for years and extinguishes the fire of conditional life, of repeated birth and death. That sankirtana movement is the prime benediction for humanity at large because it spreads the rays of the benediction moon. It is the life of all transcendental knowledge. It increases the ocean of transcendental bliss, and it enables us to fully taste the nectar for which we are always anxious.

Verse 2

Translation
Literal:
In your (divine) names manifested various kinds of full potencies (shaktis) therein bestowed, with no rules according to time for remembering them, O Lord, you are so merciful, but it is my misfortune here that I have no anuraga (interest) in those names.

Verse 3

Translation
Literal:

By considering (self) lower than straw, more tolerant than a tree, giving honour to those devoid honour, always do kirtana of hari.

Verse 4

Translation
Literal:

No wealth, no followers, no beauty or poetic praise desire I; in birth after birth let there be devotion unmotived unto thee o ishvara.

Alternatively:

O Lord of the Universe, I do not desire wealth, followers, beautiful women, nor the flowery language of the vedas; let me have only causeless devotion to you, birth after birth.

Verse 5

Translation
Literal:

o son of nanda, servitor me fallen in venom of ocean of material existence, by your mercy (kripa) consider me as particle of dust at your lotus-feet.

Verse 6

Translation
Literal:

With eyes flowing tear-streams, voice faltering, words choked, with ecstatic feelings in body, when shall i be able to chant your  (divine) name?

Verse 7

Translation
Literal:

moment comparable to yuga, eyes showering tears, empty appears whole world to me in separation of govinda

Verse 8

Translation
Literal:

by embracing with enraptment or trampling with feet, or breaking my heart by not granting vision, or flirting here and there as destined, master of my life is he, verily no other.

Extra verse
This verse follows the 8 verses written by Chaitanya in Śrī Caitanya-caritāmṛta:

Translation  
If anyone recites or hears these eight verses of instruction by Śrī Caitanya Mahāprabhu, their ecstatic love and devotion (prema-bhakti) for Kṛṣṇa increases day by day.

See also
 Hare Krishna
 Vrindavan
 Vaishnavism 
 Svayam Bhagavan
 Radha Krishna
 Chaitanya Bhagavata

References

External links
 Sikshashtaka: Lord Chaitanya's Mission (vedabase.net)
 Shikshashtakam / शिक्षाष्टकं in English and Devanagari
 

16th-century poems
Gaudiya Vaishnavism
Hindu devotional texts
Hindu texts
Poetry about spirituality
Sanskrit poetry
16th-century Indian literature